Vaux-le-Moncelot is a commune in the Haute-Saône department in the region of Bourgogne-Franche-Comté in eastern France.

Its inhabitants are the Vauxlemonçois.

Geography 
Vaux-le-Moncelot includes a communal forest, with an area of 80 hectares, made up of 77% of pedunculate oaks, 14% of hornbeam, 7% of ash trees, less than 3% of other hardwoods and douglas. It is operated by the National Forestry Office. The town is crossed to the west by the Jouanne stream.

Bordering municipalities

Town planning

Typology 
Vaux-le-Moncelot is a rural municipality, because it is part of the municipalities with little or very little density, within the meaning of the municipal density grid of INSEE.

In addition, the municipality is part of the attraction area of Besançon, of which it is a municipality in the crown. This area, which includes 312 municipalities, is categorized in areas of 200,000 to less than 700,000 inhabitants.

Land use 
The zoning of the municipality, as reflected in the database European occupation biophysical soil Corine Land Cover (CLC), is marked by the importance of the agricultural land (77.3% in 2018), nevertheless down compared to 1990 (79.2%). The detailed breakdown in 2018 is as follows:

 arable land (38.7%)
 meadows (38.4%)
 forests (17.4%)
 areas with shrub and/or herbaceous vegetation (2.9%)
 areas urbanized (2.5%)
 heterogeneous agricultural areas (0.2%).

The IGN also provides an online tool to compare the evolution over time of land use in the municipality (or in territories at different scales). Several eras are accessible as aerial maps or photos: the Cassini map (18th century), the map of Staff (1820-1866) and the current period (1950 to present).

Politics and administration

Administrative and electoral attachments 
The town is part of the district of Vesoul in the department of Haute-Saône, in the Bourgogne-Franche-Comté region. For the election of deputies, it depends on the first constituency of Haute-Saône.

Since 1793 it was part of the canton of Gy. As part of the 2014 cantonal redistribution in France, the town is now integrated into the canton of Scey-sur-Saône-et-Saint-Albin

Intercommunality 
Vaux-le-Moncelot has been a member since 2007 of the community of municipalities of Monts de Gy, a public establishment of inter-municipal cooperation (EPCI) with its own taxation created at the end of 1999 and to which the municipality has transferred a certain number of its powers, under the conditions determined by the general code of local authorities.

Demography 

In 2018, the town had 72 inhabitants, down 6% compared to 2013.

Local culture and heritage

Places and monuments 
Fontaine-lavoir built in 1861 to plans by the Grayl architect Christophe Colard.

Heraldry

See also
Communes of the Haute-Saône department

References

Communes of Haute-Saône